Mavic may refer to:

 Mavic (bicycle parts company), a French manufacturer of bicycle parts
 Mavic (UAV), a series of compact drones by DJI